The Rocky Mountain League was a minor league baseball league that operated in 1912. The Class D level league featured teams based in Colorado, New Mexico and Wyoming. The short–lived Rocky Mountain League folded during the 1912 season.

History
The Rocky Mountain League formed in 1912 as a four–team Class D level league under the direction of league president Ira Bidwell, who also managed the Cheyenne franchise in the league.

The four–team league began play on May 4, 1912. During the season, only the La Junta Railroaders franchise remained in place. The Canon City Swastikas moved to Raton, New Mexico on June 4, 1912. The Pueblo, Colorado team moved to Trinidad, Colorado on June 8, 1912 then moved again to become the Cheyenne Indians on June 28, 1912. The Colorado Springs Millionaires moved to become the Dawson Stags on June 15, 1912.

The league permanently folded on July 5, 1912. On that date the Cheyenne Indians (22–7) were in 1st place in the standings, 4.5 games ahead of the 2nd place Raton (20–14) team. They were followed by the Dawson Stags (10–20) and LaJunta Railroaders (11–22) in the final standings.

Rocky Mountain League teams

1912 Rocky Mountain League standings

References 
 McCann, M. (n.d.). Minor League Baseball History. Retrieved April 27, 2007, from WebCite query result

Defunct minor baseball leagues in the United States
Baseball leagues in Wyoming
Baseball leagues in Colorado
Baseball leagues in New Mexico
1912 establishments in the United States
1912 disestablishments in the United States
Sports leagues established in 1912
Sports leagues disestablished in 1912